Edotreotide (USAN, also known as (DOTA0-Phe1-Tyr3) octreotide, DOTA-TOC, DOTATOC) is a substance which, when bound to various radionuclides, is used in the treatment and diagnosis of certain types of cancer. When used therapeutically it is an example of peptide receptor radionuclide therapy.

Yttrium-90

A phase I clinical trial of yttrium-90 labelled edotreotide concluded in 2011, aiming to investigated effects in young cancer patients (up to 25 years of age).  Specific cancers being included in the trial include neuroblastoma, childhood brain tumours and gastrointestinal cancer.

A phase II trial for the use of 90Y DOTA-TOC for patients with metastatic carcinoid, where octreotide treatment was no longer effective, also reported results in 2010.

Lutetium-177

Lutetium-177 labelled edotreotide (177Lu-DOTA-TOC), with the trade name Solucin, is the subject of a phase 3 clinical trial for treatment of GEP-NETs. It was granted orphan drug designation by the European Medicines Agency in 2014.

See also 
 DOTA-TATE, a similar compound

References

External links 
 

Nuclear medicine procedures
Radiopharmaceuticals
Somatostatin receptor agonists
Macrocycles
Cyclic peptides
X
DOTA (chelator) derivatives